Bachra is a census town in the Tandwa CD block in the Simaria subdivision of the Chatra district in the state of Jharkhand, India.

Geography

Location

Area overview
The map alongside shows that the forests (mark the light shading), covering around 60% of Chatra district, are evenly spread across the district. The map provides links to three CCL operational areas.

Note: The map alongside presents some of the notable locations in the district. All places marked in the map are linked in the larger full screen map.

Demographics
According to the 2011 Census of India, Bachra (location code 389494) had a total population of 12,969, of which 7,169 (55%) were males and 5,800 (45%) were females. Population in the age range 0–6 years was 1,453. The total number of literate persons in Bachra was 9,718 (84.39% of the population over 6 years).

Infrastructure
According to the District Census Handbook 2011, Chatra, Bachra covered an area of 16.61 km2. Among the civic amenities, it had 26 km roads with both open and closed drains, the protected water supply involved overhead tanks, tap water from treated sources, uncovered wells. It had 2,405 domestic electric connections, 62 road light points. Among the educational facilities it had 13 primary schools, 11 middle schools, 5 secondary schools, 4 senior secondary schools. Among the social, recreational and cultural facilities it had 1 stadium, 3 auditorium/ community halls, 1 public library, reading room. It had the branch office of 2 nationalised banks.

Economy
The North Karanpura Coalfield is spread across parts of Ranchi, Hazaribagh, Chatra and Latehar districts of Jharkhand covering an area of 1,230 km2. This coalfield in the upper reaches of the Damodar Valley, has reserves of around 14 billion tonnes of coal, very little of which has been exploited. Karkatta, KD Hesalong, Manki, Churi, Bachara UG, Bachara OC, and Dakara are long established collieries south of the Damodar. North of the Damodar lies comparatively new major mines such as Piparwar Mine and Ashoka Project. 23 mines are planned in the northern sector (near Bachra). Those in an advanced stage of planning are: Dhadu, Purnadih, Magadh, and Amrapali.This happens to be the largest mining sector of Central Coalfields Limited.

Projects in the Piparwar Area of Central Coalfields Limited (as in 2015) were: Piparwar open cast, Ray-Bachra underground, Ashoka open cast, Piparwar coal handling plant and Piparwar coal preparation plant.

Transportation
Bachra is served by Ray railway station, about 25 km from Barkakana railway station on the Sonnagar-Barkakana loop line.

Healthcare
Piparwar Hospital of CCL at Bachra with 11 beds has 6 general duty medical officers and 1 specialist. Among the facilities it has are: cardiac monitor, suction machine, X-Ray machine and ECG. It has 4 ambulances.

References

Cities and towns in Chatra district
Mining in Jharkhand